This is a list of alumni notable in their own right of the University of San Carlos in Cebu City, Philippines.

Notable USC alumni

References and footnotes

San Carlos